In Greek mythology, Boösaule  (Greek Βοὸς αὐλή Boos aylē 'Cow pen') is a cave either in Egypt  or in Euboea where Io gave birth to Epaphus.

See also
 List of Greek mythological figures

References

Locations in Greek mythology